Tomáš Egert (born 1 August 1994) is a Czech footballer who plays as a centre back.

Egert is a physical central defender standing at 192 cm, he turned professional in the 2014/15 season and has made 41 professional appearances in his homeland, also playing in the Czech First League in his debut season.

Club career

Early career
Egert started his youth career with Czech First League club Bohemians 1905, joining the club as a 17 year old in the 2012/2013 season. He went on to make 10 youth appearances for the club that season. The following season Egert left Bohemians 1905 to join Slovak club Spartak Trnava.
Egert joined Spartak Trnava for the 2013/14 season, he made 24 appearances in his first season and followed this up with 20 in his second season signing his first professional contract with the club that season and featuring in the first team.

FC Slovan Liberec 
Due to his impressive form with the youth team Egert signed professional terms with the club and made his debut in their first team that season at the age of 19 as the team finished the season in 12th place in the top division.

Spartak Trnava 
Egert joined Slovak premier division side Spartak Trnava on loan for the 2014/15 season at the ago of 19, however due to his young age he did not make a 1st team appearance for the club, instead going on to make 5 appearances for their reserve team in the Slovak second division (II. Liga West).

FK Slavoj Vyšehrad 
The following season Egert went on a season long loan to second tier Czech National League side FK Slavoj Vyšehrad  on 1 July 2015 in order to gain 1st team experience. The loan move proved a success as out of a possible 28 league games that season, Egert went on to make 21 starts for the team being an integral figure in the starting line-up.

FK Viktoria Žižkov 
Following his successful season at FK Slavoj Vyšehrad Egert went out on another season long loan this time with Czech side FK Viktoria Žižkov on 1 July 2016 who were in the Fotbalová národní liga (second division), that season he went on to start 10 league games for the club.

FK Slavoj Vyšehrad
On 21 July 2017 Egert returned to the club where he tasted success only 2 years previously signing for another season long loan with FK Slavoj Vyšehrad. He started the first 5 games of the season before moving to the England.

Burton Albion 
While studying sports management at the University of Derby in England, Egert signed for English Championship side Burton Albion on Friday 16 March 2018, he went on to make his league debut the next day against Wolverhampton Wanderers on Saturday 17 March 2018.

At the start of the 2018/2019 season Egert was not offered a new contract with Burton Albion after their relegation to League One with the club stating they were unable to afford the players wage within their budget.  As a result, Tomas went on trial to several clubs including in League one, the Netherlands and the Middle East, during this period he would ruptured his anterior cruciate ligament (ACL),  the injury would keep him out of action for the entire 2018/2019 season.

On 1 August 2019, Egert returned to football after injury to join League Two side Oldham Athletic on a free transfer.

Personal life 
Egert's nickname is ‘Egi’, his favourite film is ‘Never Back Down’. His favourite sport away from football is Tennis.  His motto for life is: Live today as if it were your last’. Egert completed a bachelor's degree in sport management and master's degree at the University of Derby.

References

External links

FK Viktoria Žižkov players
1994 births
Living people
Czech expatriate sportspeople in England
Burton Albion F.C. players
Oldham Athletic A.F.C. players
English Football League players
Association football defenders
Czech footballers
FC Slavoj Vyšehrad players
FC Slovan Liberec players
FK Senica players
Footballers from Prague
Czech expatriate footballers
Expatriate footballers in Slovakia
Expatriate footballers in England
Czech expatriate sportspeople in Slovakia